Dirty Dancing is an American comedy-drama television series that ran for 11 episodes on CBS from October 29, 1988, until January 14, 1989. It was based on the film Dirty Dancing but had none of the original cast or crew. It starred Patrick Cassidy as Johnny (Patrick Swayze's character in the film) and Melora Hardin as Baby (Jennifer Grey's character in the film).

Plot
The television series followed the same basic premise of the film, with a few variations. The series was still set at Kellerman's during the summer of 1963, but instead of being the daughter of a resort guest, Baby became the daughter of Max Kellerman (in the film, Baby's last name was Houseman), and was put in charge of Johnny as Kellerman's talent director. Much like the movie, Baby noted that she intended to attend Mount Holyoke in the fall, so it was not clear how the series would continue once the summer ended. As was the case in the film, Baby and Johnny had an adversarial relationship, but eventually came to respect each other. As this was a weekly series, Baby and Johnny did not fall in love immediately, but as the series progressed, their feelings grew.

Cast
 Melora Hardin as Frances "Baby" Kellerman (in the film, Baby's last name is Houseman)
 Patrick Cassidy as Johnny Castle
 Constance Marie as Penny Rivera (in the film, Penny's last name is Johnson)
 McLean Stevenson as Max Kellerman
 Charlie Stratton as Neil Mumford (in the film, Neil's last name is Kellerman)
 Paul Feig as Norman Bryant
 John Wesley as Sweets Walker
 Adam S. Bristol as Wallace Kahn
 Mandy Ingber as Robin, Baby's cousin (credited as Amanda Ingber)

Episodes

References

External links
 

1980s American comedy-drama television series
1988 American television series debuts
1989 American television series endings
English-language television shows
Television series set in the 1960s
Television series by Lionsgate Television
Live action television shows based on films
CBS original programming
Television shows set in New York (state)